Greenwood Township is the name of some places in the U.S. state of Michigan:

 Greenwood Township, Clare County, Michigan
 Greenwood Township, Oceana County, Michigan
 Greenwood Township, Oscoda County, Michigan
 Greenwood Township, St. Clair County, Michigan
 Greenwood Township, Wexford County, Michigan

See also 
 Greenwood, Michigan (disambiguation)
 Greenwood Township (disambiguation)

Michigan township disambiguation pages